Vambola Kurg (27 August 1898 Tartu – 22 September 1981 Tartu) was an Estonian actor.

In 1915 he graduated from Tartu City School. From 1918 until 1959, he worked at the Vanemuine theatre in Tartu. Besides theatre roles he played also in several films. Kurg died, aged 83, and was buried at Rõngu Cemetery.

Filmography
 1927: Noored kotkad (feature film; role: Unt, commandant of 1st Estonian force)
 1930: Vahva sõdur Joosep Toots (feature film) 		
 1931: Kas tunned maad ... (documentary film; role: officer)

References

1898 births
1981 deaths
Estonian male stage actors
Estonian male silent film actors
Estonian male film actors
Estonian male radio actors
Male actors from Tartu